Starkey is a surname. Notable people with the surname include:

 Damien Starkey (born 1982), American producer, songwriter, composer, and musician
 Dan Starkey (actor), British actor
 David Starkey, English historian and television presenter
 David Starkey (maritime historian), British historian
 Dean Starkey, American pole vaulter
 Drew Starkey (born 1993), American actor 
 George Starkey (alchemist), English-American alchemist
 James Leslie Starkey (1895–1938), Archaeologist
 Jason Starkey, American football player
 Jennie O. Starkey (ca. 1856 – 1918), American journalist
 Jim Starkey, database architect
 Joe Starkey, American sports announcer
 Maureen Starkey Tigrett (1946–1994), first wife of Ringo Starr
 Phyllis Starkey, English politician
 Ringo Starr (born Richard Starkey in 1940), British musician, The Beatles
 Robert Lyman Starkey (1899–1991), American microbiologist 
 Thomas Starkey, English humanist writer
 Zak Starkey (born 1965), English musician, son of Ringo

See also 
 Starkey Baronets, a family in Nottingham, England
 Starkey (disambiguation)
 Starkie

English-language surnames